Park Choong-jae (born August 19, 1980), known professionally as Jun Jin, is a South Korean singer, actor and entertainer, known as a member and rapper of six-member boy band Shinhwa. He debuted as a dancer and rapper in Shinhwa in 1998 but started singing small parts in 2002; the release of Shinhwa's fifth album. He debuted as a solo artist in November 2006 with the single Love Doesn't Come.

Early life
Jun Jin was the first-born child of singer Charlie Park, also known as Park Young-chul, who debuted with a solo album Casanova Sarang in 2004. Jun Jin was born out of wedlock and due to strong opposition from his maternal family, Jun Jin's mother and father split, leaving Jun Jin to be raised by his grandmother. His father remarried, but divorced during Jun Jin's teenage years. His father's third wife proved to be a loving mother as she took care of Jun Jin and his younger sister like her own children. She also located Jun Jin's birth mother and reconnected the two. Although he wasn't able to see her frequently, the two did promise to keep in touch.

Career

1998: Debut with Shinhwa

Backed by his high school friend, An Chil-hyun, Jun Jin was able to make it through the audition as a member for Shinhwa. He debuted with them as a rapper, alongside Eric Mun and Andy Lee. However, in the release of Shinhwa's fifth album Perfect Man, he began singing small parts. He would still continue to sing small parts with the release of Shinhwa's later albums until the band switched to a different label, Good Entertainment. Under Good Entertainment, Jun Jin advanced further, singing a solo song entitled "Painfully Loving You." Jun Jin soon released a single, "Sarangee Ohji Anayo" (Love Doesn't Come), thus starting his solo career.

Jun Jin starred in the hit 2004 KBS drama Forbidden Love in 2004, alongside popular actress Kim Tae-hee. He also starred in various other Banjun Dramas as well. In 2009, he and the other members of Infinite Challenge appeared in an episode of MBC drama Queen of Housewives.

2006–2007: Solo artist
Jun Jin released his first single in November 2006 titled "사랑이 오지 않아요" (translated to "Love Doesn't Come"), with a total of five songs, including the title song and its instrumental. Surprisingly, he decided to go into ballad even though he is known for his strong dance skills. However, this is because ballads are popular in Korea right now; dance artists such as Baek Ji-young and even Jun Jin's own group Shinhwa have released ballads for their lead singles as well. The single did fairly well on the chart, though not a major hit. In December 2006, Jun Jin was hospitalised; although recommended to stay in the hospital, he quickly left and returned to his promotional schedule.

In January 2007, Jun Jin took part in the Hallyu Festival in Osaka which also featured bandmate Lee Min-woo, Kangta of H.O.T, SG Wannabe and actor Song Seung-heon at the Osaka Dome.

In early January 2007, Jun Jin filmed a music video with Taiwanese singer Linda Liao.  The music video was by the Korean group, The Name, titled "It Could Be Love." He later recorded a duet with Lao, entitled "Forever" and also has a version in Mandarin. He later released a repackage version of "Love Doesn't Come," which included the duet with Lao. The repackage version fared better in sales, selling 44,724 at the end of 2007.  In mid-2007, Jun Jin left his group's management company and set up his own call JF Story Entertainment to concentrate on his solo career more. But has since been managed by Open World Entertainment.

2008–2011: Television and military service
He released his first full-length solo album on 25 April 2008.  Titled New Decade, the first single from the album was "Wa".  The single encountered controversy when the music video was given a 19+ rating due to sexual content, in effect banning the video from major networks. On 26 April, Jun Jin held his first solo concert at Shibuya Public Hall, Tokyo. An extra show was added when the 2,500 tickets sold out in five minutes.

Jun Jin appeared variety programme Infinite Challenge firstly in April 2008 as a replacement for Haha, officially known as 'the 7th member' in June 2008. Later he joined We Got Married in early 2009 with actress Lee Si-young as his "wife". The couple was dubbed "Gundam Couple" due to Lee Si-young's obsession with Gundam. They officially departed from the show on May 3, 2009 due to the restructuring of the show's format.

He later released a mini album, titled Fascination. The title-track "Hey Ya" featuring Son Dam-bi and Big Tone did fairly well on the charts but a track on the mini album titled "Like A Fool" featuring his "wife" Lee Si-young managed to fare better on the charts. The album was a mild success.

Jun Jin enlisted for mandatory military service on 22 October 2009 as a public service worker after enduring four weeks of basic training at Nonsan military camp in Chungcheongnam-do Province. He was discharged on 14 November 2011, after working at the Gangnam Management Corporation, managing the culture center's fitness club and parking lot. He then participated at his agency's 1st Open World Festival Tokyo on 26 November. Since being discharged he held the Jun Jin: The singer's Christmas Day fan meeting in Taipei on 25 December 2011.

2012: Shinhwa comeback
In March 2012, Jun Jin played the male lead in the music video of "U.F.O" by girl group Stellar, who is produced by bandmate Eric, under his agency Top Class Entertainment.

In March 2012, Jun Jin made a group comeback with his Shinhwa bandmates after four years, under the management of 'Shinhwa Company'. It is a joint venture agency for members to perform as a group, of which Eric and Lee Min-woo are co-CEOs and the remaining members are shareholders. The Company manages the group as a whole, whilst members' individual activities are managed by their respective agencies. The group released their tenth studio album The Return on 23 March 2012, launched their comeback concerts 2012 Shinhwa Grand Tour: The Return throughout Asia and their first exclusive variety program Shinhwa Broadcast premiered on 17 March 2012 on cable channel JTBC.

As of 26 June, Jun Jin has reportedly left Open World Entertainment. Ahead of 2012 Shinhwa Grand Tour in Guangzhou: The Return on 30 June, he had microscopic nerve decompression surgery on a lumbar disc from chronic back pain. His condition had deteriorated despite being medicated since their comeback leading him to seek medical advice and subsequent surgery. He has been advised rest and physical therapy for the next six weeks, but will continue with the tour till its conclusion. Due to the surgery he was absent from the recording of episode 17, "School Channel: God of Classroom", of Shinhwa Broadcast aired on 7 July 2012. Also, still recovering from surgery, he did not take part in some of the dance numbers in both the Guangzhou and final concert in Beijing.

2013: Shinhwa Comeback

On February 8, 2013, Shinhwa's agency announced the legendary group's comeback through their official website. The poster for their comeback  2013 Shinhwa Grand Tour: The Classic to commemorate the group's 15 years since their debut was revealed. The album's name called 
The Classic.

Jun Jin is holding a live talk concert in Seoul, his first fan event here in four years, on August 18 at 5 p.m. KST, a night before his 34th birthday, according to its organizing firm SHOWNOTE on Thursday. Dubbed the “JUNJIN Live Talk 2013 – 34, Between Jun Jin and Chungjae [his real name]” (translated title), around all 900 seats to the upcoming event sold out in half a minute yesterday, SHOWNOTE added.
Despite his tight schedule due to SHINHWA's on-going Asia tour, Jun is said to have worked hard to give his best performance for several of his songs including his solo tunes “Love Is Not Coming” and “WA,” as well as talk honestly about his past 16 years as an idol singer, actor and human being.

2014: Shinhwa 16th anniversary

Jun Jin participated in the Shinhwa 16th Anniversary Concert along with other Shinhwa members in Olympic Gymnastics Arena. The concert was held for two days: 22 and 23 March and Jun Jin said he will consider to record a new solo album in this year.

Discography

Studio albums

EPs

Single albums

Video albums

Filmography

Film

Television series
 2003 - Nonstop 4
 2004 - Forbidden Love aka Nine-Tailed Fox
 2005 - 해변으로 가요 (Let's Go To The Beach)
 2005 - Banjun Drama - SBS
 2008 - Here He Comes - MBC
 2008 - Chinese drama: You are my dreams - 你是我的夢
 2009 - MBC daily drama: That Person is Coming as PD / TV Director (airing in Oct 06th, 2008 - Feb 27th, 2009)

Television shows

Awards

Best Star award at the 2008 MBC Entertainment Awards -Infinite Challenge
Hot Character Star: Jun Jin in Mnet 20's Choice Awards 2008
14th SBS Entertainment Awards Best Teamwork Award	 Same Bed, Different Dreams 2: You Are My Destiny

Notes
 A  The Gaon Music Chart began releasing data in 2010 after the Music Industry Association of Korea stopped compiling data in 2008. Online sources for charts after September 2008 and before January 2010 are currently unavailable.

References

External links 

  
https://www.imdb.com/name/nm2088674/ (in English)

1980 births
Living people
Infinite Challenge members
Shinhwa members
South Korean television personalities
South Korean male television actors
South Korean male singers
South Korean male idols
South Korean J-pop singers
South Korean pop singers
Male actors from Seoul
Rappers from Seoul
CI Entertainment artists